Benjamin "Benny" Baruch J. Bass (December 4, 1904 – June 25, 1975), known as "Little Fish", was an American boxer. He was born in Kyiv, Ukraine, with his family emigrating to the United States in 1906; choosing to settle in Philadelphia, Pennsylvania. Bass was world featherweight champion and world junior lightweight champion during his career. Statistical boxing website BoxRec lists Bass as the #17 ranked lightweight of all time.  He was inducted into the International Jewish Sports Hall of Fame in 1994 and the International Boxing Hall of Fame in 2002.  Strongly built with muscular shoulders, Bass's signature punch was a powerful left hook to the midsection, and he enjoyed fighting on the inside, a frequent requirement from his relative lack of reach.

Early life and amateur career

Bass was born in Kyiv, Russian Empire on December 4, 1904, the second son to Jewish parents Jacob and Pauline and was brought to America three years later.  His father first came to Philadelphia to earn enough money to send for his five sons and wife in Kiev.  They sailed to America but were first rescued from a shipwreck on their way, spending five weeks in Queenstown, Ireland.  By ten, he was making a living selling newspapers at a busy street corner in Philadelphia.   In his early teens, Benny held down a job at Curtis Publishing Company, who published The Saturday Evening Post.  From age twelve to sixteen, Bass won 95 of 100 bouts as an amateur.  Impressively, he qualified for the Olympic Trials in the Flyweight Class in 1920, where he lost a decision to the future Gold Medal winner Frankie Genaro. Turning pro the following year, he was managed by Phil Glassman.  By 1926, he was rated the number one featherweight contender.

In an important early career bout, Bass defeated Johnny Dixon, a leading featherweight contender, in a ten-round newspaper decision on August 30, 1923.

On January 11, 1926, Bass defeated Leo (Kid) Roy, in a ten-round points decision in Philadelphia.  In an action filled bout, Roy held a slight lead through the first five rounds.  Roy may have taken the sixth and eighth.  The fighting was particularly fierce in the ninth and tenth, with both boxers swapping punches at close range, but Bass had acquired enough points in the last five rounds to take the decision.

Before an impressive crowd of 20,000, in one of his most important early wins, Bass defeated highly rated featherweight contender Babe Herman on September 1, 1926 in a ten-round points decision at Shibe Park in Philadelphia.  In a raucous battle, Bass dropped Herman to the canvas in five instances, with three times in the second for counts of nine, two, and nine, once in the third for a count of seven, and once in the tenth for a count of six where Herman could have risen earlier. Herman's need to fight a defensive battle marred the bout with frequent instances of clinching.  His opponent threw several looping rights, but Bass was usually able to come inside of them as an effective defense.  Several times Herman's right did connect with jaw and body at close quarters, but Bass weathered the blows quickly.  Herman threw a right in the second, followed almost instantaneously from a left from Bass that sent both boxers to the canvas, though Bass recovered more quickly and was on his feet.  Herman took a count of nine on one knee. At 5'4", with a two-inch advantage in height, Herman likely benefited from a slight reach advantage, but Bass tended to do well against boxers with slight advantages in reach.

Early in his career on June 27, 1927, Bass defeated Jewish New York boxer Joe Glick in a ten-round points decision at Shibe Park in Philadelphia. Bass sent Glick to the canvas twice in the fifth, once for a count of eight.  Respecting each other's abilities, and suffering from fatigue, the match was marked by frequent clinching.  Several times in later rounds Glick was staggered by Bass's punches but managed to stay on his feet.

Taking the NBA world feather title, 1927

On September 12, 1927, Bass defeated Jewish boxer Red Chapman (Morris Kaplan) before an extraordinary crowd of 30,000 in Philadelphia for the NBA world featherweight championship in a ten-round unanimous decision.  In the fourth through seventh, Bass managed to fight from a distance using his long game to prevent Chapman from opening a swollen cut on his eye opened in the third round.  Bass led a two fisted slugging attack in the seventh, eighth, and ninth, that gained him a points margin and won him the decision of all three judges. In the early ninth, an unusual sight occurred, when both boxers charged each other, landing rights to their jaws and were knocked to the canvas simultaneously.  Bass recovered more quickly, but Chapman took a count of eight before resuming the bout.

Losing world feather title, 1928

Bass lost the world featherweight title to Tony Canzoneri on February 10, 1928 at Madison Square Garden in a fifteen-round split decision, with Bass sustaining a break to his right collarbone from a left to the jaw at the end of the third round that landed him hard on the canvas, causing the collarbone damage.  Bass inflicted some severe body punishment during the fight, but Canzoneri eased ahead on points after Bass's knockdown in the third that resulted in his injury.

Bass defeated Jewish Philadelphian boxer Harry Blitman before a crowd of 24,000 on September 10, 1928 in a sixth-round knockout at Shibe Park in Philadelphia. Blitman was considered a leading contender for the world featherweight crown, and the bout was billed as a USA Pennsylvania State Featherweight Title.  Bass put Bitman to the canvas in the sixth with a series of hard rights, and had scored a knockdown for a count of seven in the second round.

He defeated former Junior Lightweight Champion Mike Ballerino, in a fast ten round points decision on October 17, 1927. "Bass, who was outweighed by seven pounds punched hard and accounted for a knockdown in the fourth round but Ballerino was up at the count of eight".

Taking world jr. lightweight title, 1929
Bass would first take the World Junior Lightweight Championship before a crowd of 9,000 by defeating Tod Morgan on December 20, 1929 at New York's famed Madison Square Garden.  Morgan, who had held the title for four years, opened the first round with power, and mounted a first round bombardment that left Bass somewhat groggy and weak.  Bass, who was a 3-1 favorite completed the first round reeling and dizzy from several strong straight right hand shots to the chin from Morgan.  The knockout occurred from two sweeping right hand punches from Bass, only fifty-one seconds into the second round.  The first right, almost at the opening bell, put Morgan to the canvas for a count of nine.  After Morgan rose after the count, Bass put him down with the final right to the chin that ended the bout.
  
Bass first defended the title on February 3, 1930, against Davey Abad in a fourth-round technical knockout in St. Louis.  According to the New York Times, Bass floored Abad four times in the fourth round.  Abad was down twice in the first round from lefts by Bass, though he appeared to win by a shade in both the second and third rounds.

Although he could only lose his title by knockout, Bass lost to Italian boxer Eddie Shea, before a considerable crowd of 16,000, in a world jr. lightweight title bout in St. Louis, in a ten-round newspaper decision on March 28, 1930.  Shea had a significant reach advantage, and a six-inch advantage in height.  In the opening of the fifth round, Bass sent Shea to the canvas for a nine count.  In the opening of the seventh, in a close bout, Shea crashed a hook to Bass's jaw that sent him to the canvas for a nine count as well.  Shea was the aggressor through much of the fight, and in the opinion of many ringside observers, won the no decision bout on points. Shea used a strong left hook to counter the effective right of Bass.  Bass later defeated Shea in a second-round knockout in Atlantic City on August 31, 1934, that became one of Shea's last bouts before boxing retirement.  Bass put Shea to the canvas in the second round with a right to the chin that put Shea down for the count, and left him unable to rise immediately afterwards.

Bass defeated future world light welterweight champion, Johnny Jadick on December 8, 1930 in a ten-round unanimous decision in Philadelphia.  The referee called the third, fourth, and fifth even, but gave the other seven rounds to Bass who came close to knocking out his opponent.  Jadick may have looked best in the fourth where he put his reach advantage to good use, enjoying a nearly five inch advantage in height as well.

Bass defeated Lew Massey on January 5, 1931 before a near capacity crowd of 10,000 in a ten-round newspaper decision for the world junior lightweight title at the Arena in Philadelphia.  Bass landed a fusillade of punches to the body that weakened his opponent, who had to use his best defenses to avoid a knockout in the closing rounds.  In the first three rounds, Massey made a better start, taking them by a shade against his opponent and scoring occasionally with lefts and rights that jarred but did not deter Bass.  In the closing rounds, both boxers showed fatigue, and clinched frequently in a defensive move.  Leading most of the way, scorers gave Bass seven of the ten rounds, with two to Massey and one even.

Bass defeated Bud Taylor in Philadelphia in a second-round technical knockout on February 16, 1931 in what would have been a ten-round bout. Bass appeared to take the first round with sheer aggressiveness.  Taylor was winning the second round with smashes to head and body, before Bass fought back and landed what appeared by many to be a low blow to the midruff.  Because the crowd and Taylor believed the blow that ended the bout was a low foul, the crowd was greatly displeased with the call for the technical knockout, though it made Bass one of only two men to ever knock Taylor out.  Oddly, the referee instructed the boxers to continue boxing an exhibition for the next five rounds to satisfy the crowd, and both boxers complied.

Bass defeated Eddie Mack on May 4, 1931 at the arena in Philadelphia by knockout with a crushing right to the right side of the chin that broke Mack's lower right jaw in the third round.

Losing world junior light title, 1931
Bass lost the world junior lightweight title on July 15, 1931 before a large crowd of 15,000, to black Cuban boxer Kid Chocolate in a technical knockout, 2:58 into the seventh round in Philadelphia.  Chocolate battered Bass with rapid fire flurries of lefts and rights through six rounds, and though Bass connected several times with blows that stung Chocolate and made him hold, the Cuban boxer maintained a comfortable margin on points, finally ending the bout in the seventh with rights and lefts to the head and face.  When Chocolate cornered Bass against the ropes in the seventh, the referee called the bout without a knockdown having occurred.

On April 14, 1932, Bass knocked out Micky Doyle early in the second round in Wilmington, Delaware.  Doyle was first down from a right to the jaw for a count of nine, and then when Doyle resumed the match, Bass ended it for good.

Before a crowd of 20,000, near the end of his career on July 27, 1937, Bass lost to the incomparable black boxer Henry Armstrong in a knockout from a looping right had punch, 2:35 into the fourth round at the Baker Bowl in Philadelphia.  Armstrong would become a world champion in three weight divisions in his career.  Armstrong penetrated Bass's defenses with high rights almost at will throughout the bout.  At 32, Bass was no match for Armstrong, though he managed to stay on his feet until the fourth.

Life after boxing
Retiring from the ring in 1940, he worked as a liquor and beer salesman for Penn Beer Distributors in the Philadelphia area until 1960, when he became a clerk in Philadelphia Traffic Court. On June 25, 1975, Bass died at 70 at Rolling Hills hospital in Philadelphia where he had been a patient for several months.  He had suffered from heart complications.  He left a wife, daughter, three children, and a great grandchild.  He had been married a total of three times.  He is enshrined in the Pennsylvania Boxing Hall of Fame.

Professional boxing record
All information in this section is derived from BoxRec, unless otherwise stated.

Official record

All newspaper decisions are officially regarded as "no decision" bouts and are not counted in the win/loss/draw column.

Unofficial record

Record with the inclusion of newspaper decisions in the win/loss/draw column.

See also
List of super featherweight boxing champions
List of select Jewish boxers

References

External links
 
Benny Bass - Cyber Boxing Zone Profile
IBHOF Biography - Benny Bass

|-

 

|-

 

 https://titlehistories.com/boxing/wba/wba-world-sf.html

1904 births
1975 deaths
Emigrants from the Russian Empire to the United States
Boxers from Pennsylvania
Featherweight boxers
Jewish boxers
Sportspeople from Kyiv
World featherweight boxing champions
World super-featherweight boxing champions
American people of Russian-Jewish descent
World boxing champions
Super-featherweight boxers
Jewish American boxers
American people of Ukrainian-Jewish descent
Ukrainian Jews
American male boxers
20th-century American Jews